Allen's of Tenby was a firm of photographers established in "The Excelsior Studio", a photography studio at 1 Campbell House, High Street, Tenby, Pembrokeshire, opened by Harry Mortimer Allen (1864-1926) in 1890. In 1896, the studio was renamed "The Campbell Studio". Mortimer specialised in portraiture and landscapes. He was also a dealer in fine art and  a picture framer. He also took "occasion" photographs and postcard images of Tenby and other local districts. In addition to black and white, he made colour-tinted postcards.

References

Photographic studios
19th-century Welsh photographers
Tenby
Postcard artists
1890 establishments in the United Kingdom
Photography companies of the United Kingdom